The following is a timeline of the history of the city of San Salvador, El Salvador.

Prior to 20th century

 1525 – San Salvador founded by Spaniard Gonzalo de Alvarado.
 1526 – "Settlement destroyed by Indians."
 1528 – San Salvador refounded by Spaniard .
 1831 – San Salvador becomes capital of the Central American Union.
 1840 – San Salvador becomes capital of El Salvador.
 1841 – University of El Salvador founded.
 1842 – Catholic Diocese of San Salvador established.
 1849 –  (cemetery) established.
 1854 – April 16: Earthquake.
 1870 – National Palace built.
 1890 – Siglo XX newspaper begins publication.

20th century

1900s–1960s

 1911
 Liberty Monument erected in Duenas Park.
 National Palace rebuilt.
 1917
 Earthquake.
 National Theatre of El Salvador opens.
 1920 – Population: 80,100.
 1921
 Siman (shop) in business.
 Casa Presidencial (government residence) built.
 1923 – Ilopango military airfield begins operating.
 1932 – Estadio Jorge "Mágico" González (stadium) built.
 1934 – Flood.
 1935 –  (park) established.
 1936 – El Diario de Hoy newspaper headquartered in San Salvador.
 1949 – 	Tribuna Libre newspaper begins publication.
 1950
 Club Deportivo Atlético Marte formed.
 Population: 161,951.
 1951
 Cathedral burns down.
 Organization of Central American States headquartered in city.
 1953 –  (church) built.
 1955 – Cine Avenida (cinema) opens (approximate date).
 1956 – San Salvador Cathedral construction begins.
 1958 – El Salvador Amateur Radio Club headquartered in city.
 1960 – Alianza Fútbol Club active.
 1964
 José Napoleón Duarte becomes mayor.
  (library) building constructed.
 1965 – Jesuit Central American University founded.
 1969 – "Metroplan 80" (city plan) created.

1970s–1990s

 1970
 Metrocentro shopping mall in business.
 Carlos Antonio Herrera Rebollo becomes mayor.
 1971
  opens.
 Population: 337,171.
 1972 –  in business.
 1974 – José Antonio Morales Ehrlich becomes mayor.
 1975 –  opens.
 1976
 Estadio Cuscatlán (stadium) opens.
 José Napoleón Gómez becomes mayor.
 1977 – February 28: Political demonstration; crackdown.
 1978 – Hugo Guerra becomes mayor.
 1979 – Julio Adolfo Rey Prendes becomes mayor.
 1980
 March 24: Archbishop Óscar Romero assassinated.
 El Salvador International Airport opens.
 1981 – October 24: Bombing.
 1982 – Alejandro Duarte becomes mayor.
 1985 – José Antonio Morales Ehrlich becomes mayor again.
 1986 – October 10: 1986 San Salvador earthquake.
 1988
 December: Car bombing.
 Armando Calderón Sol becomes mayor.
 1989
 November 11: FMLN attacks.
 November 16: Murder of six Jesuits
 Diario Co Latino newspaper in publication.
 1992 – Population: 415,346.
 1994 – Mario Valiente becomes mayor.
 1995 – Centro Comercial Galerias shopping mall in business.
 1996 – Homies Unidos (community group) founded.
 1997
 Hilton Hotel in business.
 Héctor Silva becomes mayor.
 1999 – Museo de la Palabra y la Imagen opens.

21st century

 2002
 RN-5 highway opens.
 San Salvador Fútbol Club formed.
 2003
  and  building open.
 Carlos Rivas Zamora becomes mayor.
 2005 – Sister city relationship established with Los Angeles, USA.
 2006 – Violeta Menjívar becomes mayor.
 2007 – Population: 316,090.
 2009
 World Trade Center San Salvador built.
 Norman Quijano becomes mayor.
 RN-21 highway opens.
 2010
 June: Bus attacks.
 Torre El Pedregal built.
 2011 –  (park) established.
 2014 – Air pollution in San Salvador reaches annual mean of 42 PM2.5 and 77 PM10, more than recommended.

See also
 San Salvador history
 List of mayors of San Salvador 1964–present
 History of El Salvador

References

This article incorporates information from the Spanish Wikipedia and German Wikipedia.

Bibliography

External links

 Map of San Salvador, 1998
 Items related to San Salvador, various dates (via Digital Public Library of America)

History of San Salvador
San Salvador
El Salvador-related lists
Years in El Salvador
San Salvador